Mała Wierzyca is a river of Poland, a tributary of the Wierzyca near Zamek Kiszewski.

Rivers of Poland
Rivers of Pomeranian Voivodeship